Søren Ryge Petersen is a Danish television presenter, journalist, and writer.

Born in Gram, South Denmark, on 31 July 1945, Petersen grew up some 50 km further south in Achtrup, Schleswig-Holstein.

The holder of an M.A. in Danish language from Aarhus University, he is a self-taught horticulturalist and was editor from 1978 to 1990 of the magazine Haven ("The Garden") published by The Danish Garden Society. He has also written for the leading daily newspaper Politiken.

Petersen began working for the Danish national broadcasting corporation DR in 1977  and in 1988 he got his own show on DR television: DR Derude ("Out There"), a gardening programme in which a camera crew followed him around his own garden at Djursland as he demonstrated how he looked after it and talked about the flowers and crop plants it contained. In 1992, the programme went live under the name of DR Derude Direkte, later renamed Søren Ryge. Edition number 100 was broadcast on 6 August 2008 and presented a series of clips from the earlier shows.

As well as DR Derude, Søren Ryge Petersen has made a series of other programmes for DR, presenting the nature of the world and its people, with particular emphasis on the portrayal of people living simple lives.

Bibliography 
Dansk eller tysk, 1975
Landet og året, 1995
Historier fra Danmark, 1998
Spørg Søren, 2001
Fortællinger fra et tv-liv, 2001
I haven, 2002

References

Danish television presenters
1945 births
Living people
20th-century Danish journalists
21st-century Danish journalists
Politiken writers
Danish garden writers